Forest Grove High School is a public high school in Forest Grove, Oregon, United States. Founded in 1907, it is the only high school in the Forest Grove School District.

Academics
The school has been awarded the Bronze Medal in the U.S. News & World Report rankings of America's Best High Schools. The school once had the highest dropout rate in Washington County and test scores below the state average in the early 2000s. Forest Grove High hired a new principal, John O'Neil, to address these issues in 2002. He introduced mandatory reading and math workshops for students below the state average to raise their performance. This, and other changes, helped to reduce the dropout rate and improve test scores. For these improvements, in 2006 the school was presented the Closing the Achievement Gap award from the State of Oregon. The following year, the 2,000-student school became the first high school to win the award two years in a row. During this time, graduation rates improved from around 66% to 85%.

In 2008, 73% of the school's seniors received a high school diploma. Of 444 students, 325 graduated, 51 dropped out, 19 received a modified diploma, and 49 were still in high school the following year.

In 2009, The Oregonian described the school as an "overachiever" at teaching reading and math, due to its achievement scores.

Athletics
 State championship in women's softball: 2007
 State championship in women's wrestling: 2022

Notable programs
In 1976, the school started the Viking House Program, in which students build a single-family home each year in the community. They begin building in early September and finish construction with an open house in late May. The house is then put up for sale at market price, with the proceeds used for furthering the program with purchases of new tools and the materials for the next house. This program is one of few focused on house construction in Portland-area schools, in addition to those at Canby High School and Benson Polytechnic High School. The program adopted "learn by doing" as their motto. Through 2011, the program had built 35 homes.

The school also operates a firefighting cadet program that began in 2001. The program allows juniors and seniors to learn firefighting techniques that are usually taught at the community college level to prepare students for careers in firefighting. Forest Grove’s fire department and the school partner in the program with the fire department providing instructors.

In 2015, the school began publishing an online newspaper, The Advocate, written and edited by students. Published monthly during the school year, it emulates a full-fledged city newspaper, with national and world news sections. The September 2019 edition, for example, covered the devastation in the Bahamas from Hurricane Dorian. Along with sports and school news, it also provides a platform for student commentaries, such as criticism of  Disney Channel television program changes.

Notable alumni
 Bobby Chouinard, baseball pitcher
 Robert Garrigus, golfer
 Mitch Meeuwsen, football player
 Zac Rosscup, baseball pitcher

Further reading

References

External links
 
 The Advocate, student-published newspaper

Buildings and structures in Forest Grove, Oregon
High schools in Washington County, Oregon
Educational institutions established in 1907
Public high schools in Oregon
1907 establishments in Oregon